Thabo Nodada (born 2 May 1995 in Ixopo, Kwa-Zulu Natal) is a South African soccer player who plays as a midfielder for Cape Town City and the South Africa national team.

Club career
He joined Cape Town City in 2016 when they purchased the PSL licence of his former club, Mpumalanga Black Aces.

International career
He made his international debut for South Africa on 8 October 2020 in a 1–1 draw with Namibia.

Personal life
Nodada was born in Ixopo.

References

1995 births
Living people
Mpumalanga Black Aces F.C. players
Cape Town City F.C. (2016) players
South African soccer players
South Africa international soccer players
Association football defenders
People from Ubuhlebezwe Local Municipality
Soccer players from KwaZulu-Natal